Blackroot may refer to:

Blackroot, a common name for plants in the genus Pterocaulon
Blackroot, a translation of Morthond, a river in Middle Earth

See also
Black root